Robert Lindstedt and Horia Tecău were the defending champions and they were able to retain their title, beating Simon Aspelin and Andreas Siljeström in the final, 6–3, 6–3.

The final was Aspelin's last professional tennis match, since he chose to retire after this tournament.

Seeds

Draw

Draw

References

External links
 Main Draw

Swedish Open - Doubles
2011 Doubles